An Ernst Thälmann Pioneer Organisation session (Pioniernachmittag) was a regular gathering of members of the Ernst Thälmann Pioneer Organisation in the GDR. The session was organised by the class teacher (form tutor) or an adult volunteer for all pioneers of a form and took place on Wednesday afternoons. In 1989, 98% of all schoolchildren in the GDR were member of the Ernst Thälmann Pioneer Organisation. Subsequently, the regular afternoons could be considered as being part the extracurricular school life.

Ernst Thälmann Pioneer Organisation sessions consisted of a mixture of social activities, adventure, and myth-like socialist teaching. Social activities and adventures included sports, discos, walks, hand-crafts, celebrations or paper chases. These activities were comparable to that of other youth organisations like the Scouts. More propaganda-like activities were visits of the Soviet Army and police or lectures about the history of Socialism or the October Revolution.

Furthermore, the school achievements (or the lack thereof) of individual pupils were publicly discussed in these sessions. Strong students were assigned to weak students as tutors.

Regularly, afternoons were used to collect waste for recycling from individual households. Pupils walked from door to door and asked for paper, metal, glass bottles and jars, or clothes. The resources were sold and the proceeds were given to charitable causes (like Vietnam or Sandinists) or used for school activities. In 1979/80, pupils collected 73 million jars and bottles of glass, 20,000 tons of metal, 30,000 tons of paper and 9,000 tons of used textiles.

See also
Ernst Thälmann Pioneer Organisation

Further reading
After The Wall: Confessions from an East German Childhood and the Life that Came Next by Jana Hensel, 2004 
Youth in the GDR: Everyday life of young people under socialism by Jochen Weyer, 1974

References

Education in East Germany
Pioneer movement